Pachyosa hirtiventris is a species of beetle in the family Cerambycidae. It was described by Gressitt in 1937, originally under the genus Coptops. It is known from Japan.

References

Mesosini
Beetles described in 1937